Raymond Noel Tixier (25 December 1912 – 10 May 1940) was a French field hockey player. He competed in the men's tournament at the 1936 Summer Olympics. He was killed during the Second World War.

Personal life
Tixier served as a second lieutenant in the French Air Force during the Second World War. He was killed in action on 10 May 1940 during the Battle of France.

References

External links and other languages on Wikipedia 
 
 Raymond Noël TIxier at Wikipédia (French version)

1912 births
1940 deaths
French male field hockey players
Olympic field hockey players of France
Field hockey players at the 1936 Summer Olympics
French Air Force personnel of World War II
French military personnel killed in World War II